Letang, "लेटाङ " is a Municipality in Morang District in the Province No. 1 of south-eastern Nepal.
It was formed by merging the existing Village Development Committees of Letang, Jante, Warrangi and Bhogateni. This municipality is situated in Hilly Region as well as Terai Region. Letang is full of natural beauty.  Previously it was called Letang Bhogateni but now it's known as Letang.

Location

Letang is in the north of Morang District. 

Letang is situated on the bank of the Chisang River. It is located 46  km Northeast of Biratnagar 394  km east of Kathmandu, at the northern edge of the Terai plain below the Hills.
It is a municipality and the urban core of a rapidly growing urban agglomerate in Nepal. 
It has neighbouring municipalities like Koshi Haraicha, Belbari, Pathari-Sanischare etc.. 
Letang Municipality is one of the developed municipalities of Morang district with various utilities including drinking water, electricity, communication, etc.

There is also uneven population distribution in this VDC. Many national politicians, players, and film actors such as Babu Bogati, Praween Khatiwada, and Ram Bhujel are also from this village. A popular Nepali music composer Pralhad Bogatee from Kathmandu is also staying here for years. Far more, the yearly Rajarani Festival (Mohatshob) is also celebrated by various organizations for its popularity and fame. The villages including Phadani, Budhabare, Kheruwa, Khaireni, Kirtiman, Kamalpur, Lokhra, Kuinkunda, Biran, etc. lie here. Among them Letang Bazaar is the most developed and Rajarani has religious and tourism importance being an old village in Letang.

Population

At the time of the 2011 Nepal census Letang had a population of 18,552 people living in 4,359 individual households.  
According to 2011 Census, Letang Municipality had a population of 32,034545        5 in 7,339 households.
There were 14,350 males and 17,703 females.

Religion and ethnicity

Temples including Rajarani temple (one of the oldest temple of this area), Laxmi Narayan Mandir, Laxmi Panchayan Mandir etc. lies here. 
The main ethnic groups here are Limbu, Brahmin, Chhetri, Magar, Rai, Tamang etc.

Economy

More than 70% of the people in this municipality are engaged in agriculture.

Education

District-famous schools and Campus including Letang Campus, Shanti Bhagawati School Shree Shiksha Vikash M. V. (Kheruwa), Laxmi School, Galaxy Academy, Green Valley School, Minaruwa School, Letang Secondary Boarding School, Bal Niketan School, Pathibhara Boarding School lies here. 
There is the eastern regional training academy of Nepal Army and also the eastern regional training Centre of Agricultural Development Bank, though the bank does not exist nearby.

References

Letang Municipality
Municipalities in Koshi Province
Municipalities in Morang District

Edited by dupan niraula